Luís Manuel Alves Rolão Baltazar, known as Baltazar (born 25 November 1966), is a Portuguese football coach and a former player. He is currently the assistant manager of Cameroon national football team.

He played 8 seasons and 171 games in the Primeira Liga for Braga, Torreense, Belenenses, Vitória de Setúbal and Académica de Coimbra.

Club career
He made his Primeira Liga debut for Vitória de Setúbal on 7 September 1985 as a second-half substitute in a 3–1 victory over Sporting Covilhã.

Coaching career
As assistant coach of Toni Conceição at CFR Cluj he won the Romanian Cup for two times (2009, 2016), the Romanian Supercup (2009).

In Portugal, Baltazar and Conceição won the Segunda Liga for two times; in 2008 with Trofense and in 2014 with Moreirense.

References

1966 births
People from Castelo Branco, Portugal
Living people
Portuguese footballers
Vitória F.C. players
Primeira Liga players
C.F. União players
Liga Portugal 2 players
Associação Académica de Coimbra – O.A.F. players
C.D. Olivais e Moscavide players
S.C.U. Torreense players
Louletano D.C. players
S.C. Braga players
C.F. Os Belenenses players
G.D. Estoril Praia players
Atlético Clube de Portugal players
Portuguese football managers
Portuguese expatriate football managers
Expatriate football managers in Romania
Association football midfielders
Sportspeople from Castelo Branco District